V. T. Patil (born 31 July 1900 - death unknown) was an education reformer and politician who represented Kolhapur as a Member of Parliament in the 3rd Lok Sabha that sat between 1962 and 1967. His interest in development of education in Kolhapur — a town in Maharashtra, India — is reflected in the various institutions that he either founded or was involved in founding.

Background
Patil was born in Shigaon, Sangli district, Bombay Presidency, British India on 31 July 1900. He graduated from the University of Bombay with a degree in law and between 1930-1950 he had a legal practice in Kolhapur.

Rural education
Patil had an interest in developing rural and women's education in Kolhapur. He was involved in the establishment of Tararani Vidyapeeth's Junior College of Education, and was a co-founder of Shri Mouni Vidyapeeth. In addition, he founded Kamala College and helped to establish Shivraj College of Arts & Commerce.

Member of Parliament
Patil was elected a Member of Parliament for the  third Lok Sabha in 1962. He represented the Kolhapur constituency as a member of the Indian National Congress.

References

India MPs 1962–1967
People from Kolhapur
Lok Sabha members from Maharashtra
1900 births
Year of death missing
University of Mumbai alumni
People from Sangli district
Indian National Congress politicians from Maharashtra